Michał Piotr Wypij (born 13 December 1985 in Wrocław) is a Polish politician, member of the IX Sejm, elected in 2019. He is a member of the Agreement political party.

References

1985 births
Living people
Members of the Polish Sejm 2019–2023